Surekha Marie – was an Indian actress. She was a prominent lead actress during the 1980s in Malayalam, Tamil, Kannada, and Telugu films. Her debut role in the Bharathan movie Thakara was well noted for her performance.

Background
Surekha was born into a Christian family in Andhra Pradesh. Her father P. Ramaravu, was the general manager in a factory and mother was a teacher. She had a brother, Naveen. Since her father got a job in a bank in Chennai her family migrated to Tamil Nadu. She had her primary education from Chennai Holy Angels school and obtained her master's degree in English Literature and P.G. diploma in Advertising. She had produced one Telugu serial and she had acted in a Telugu serial and she did a Hindi serial "Vishwa Mitra" before her marriage.

Family
She was married to Doctor Sreenivas in 1995 but he is no more  She had a daughter, Katherine. She left the film field after marriage. Then she concentrated on business. She owned a production company called Chennai Media Plus. She made a comeback through a 2012 movie Masters. She resided at Chennai with family.

Filmography

TV serials

References

External links

Surekha at MSI

1955 births
2021 deaths
Indian Christians
Actresses in Malayalam cinema
Indian film actresses
Actresses in Tamil cinema
Actresses in Kannada cinema
Actresses in Telugu cinema
Actresses from Chennai
20th-century Indian actresses
21st-century Indian actresses
Indian television actresses
Actresses in Tamil television
Actresses in Malayalam television